Lysa Hora or Łysa Góra (literally "Bald Mountain" meaning barren mountain, featureless mountain in Slavic languages) and similar may mean:

Lysa Hora
 Lysa Hora (Kiev), a large woody hill in Kiev
 Lysá hora, a mountain in the Czech Republic
 Lysa Hora (folklore), a mountain related to witchcraft in Slavic folk mythology

Łysa Góra
Łysa Góra, one of the Świętokrzyskie mountains in central Poland.
Łysa Góra, Lesser Poland Voivodeship (south Poland)
Łysa Góra, part of the Swoszowice district of Kraków
Łysa Góra, Łódź Voivodeship (central Poland)
Łysa Góra, Hrubieszów County in Lublin Voivodeship (east Poland)
Łysa Góra, Puławy County in Lublin Voivodeship (east Poland)
Łysa Góra, Subcarpathian Voivodeship (south-east Poland)
Łysa Góra, Warmian-Masurian Voivodeship (north Poland)
Łysa Góra, West Pomeranian Voivodeship (north-west Poland)